Kenneth is an English given name and surname. The name is an Anglicised form of two entirely different Gaelic personal names: Cainnech and Cináed. The modern Gaelic form of Cainnech is Coinneach; the name was derived from a byname meaning "handsome", "comely". A short form of Kenneth is Ken.

Etymology 
The second part of the name Cinaed is derived either from the Celtic *aidhu, meaning "fire", or else Brittonic jʉ:ð meaning "lord".

People
(see also Ken (name) and Kenny)

Places
In the United States:
 Kenneth, Indiana
 Kenneth, Minnesota
 Kenneth City, Florida
In Scotland:
 Inch Kenneth, an island off the west coast of the Isle of Mull

Other
 "What's the Frequency, Kenneth?", a song by R.E.M.
 Hurricane Kenneth
 Cyclone Kenneth

References

English-language masculine given names
English masculine given names
Scottish masculine given names